Roni Porokara (born 12 December 1983) is a Finnish former international footballer.

Club career

FC Hämeenlinna 
On 15 May 2003, at age 19, Roni Porokara made his league debut in a match between FC Hämeenlinna and KuPS. During his two-year spell with Hämeenlinna, he made 46 league appearances and scored 6 goals.

FC Honka 
He joined FC Honka in 2005, and played there until the end of 2007, making 76 league appearances and scoring 24 goals.

Örebro SK 
In 2008, Porokara moved to the Swedish Premier Division side Örebro SK staying there until the end of 2010, making 84 league appearances and scoring 11 goals.

At the end of the 2009 Allsvenskan season, after playing for a year in Örebro SK, Porokara entered into negotiations with Israeli clubs, Maccabi Haifa and Maccabi Tel Aviv. Porokara attracted interest from Maccabi Haifa due to his eligibility to receive Israeli citizenship under the law of return. He was set to transfer to Maccabi Haifa in January 2010, for $700,000, but the deal fell through.

In August 2010, Porokara attracted interest from number of clubs in Europe. Wigan Athletic from the Premier League was the big name out of this clubs along with Cesena from Serie A, and a few clubs from Germany, Belgium, and Switzerland. After Örebro finished third in 2010, Porokara announced that he would not renew his contract with the Swedes.

Beerschot AC 
On 3 December 2010 he signed with Beerschot, where he stayed until the summer of 2012, before moving to Ironi Kiryat Shmona in Israel.

Back to FC Honka 
Porokara returned to FC Honka in 2015 after the team was relegated to Kakkonen due to financial problems. After appearing five times and scoring once, Porokara was forced to retire from active football because of a hip problem.

International career 
On 13 April 2005, Porokara made his only appearance for the Finnish under-21 side in a friendly match against their Estonian counterparts. His full national team debut came a year later on 25 May 2006 in a friendly against Sweden. Porokara was a late substitute and only got a minute on the pitch.

On 8 November 2010, Porokara scored the winning goal against Belgium in friendly game.

International goals 
Updated 12 December 2009

Honours

Club

FC Honka 
 Ykkönen: 2005

Individual 
 BV Cup Player of the Tournament: 2006
 Veikkausliiga All-Star Team: 2006

Statistics

See also
List of select Jewish football (association; soccer) players

References

External links 
 Profile on Finnish national team website 
 Profile on Örebro SK official website 
 

1983 births
Living people
Footballers from Helsinki
Finnish footballers
Finnish expatriate footballers
Finland international footballers
Finland under-21 international footballers
Finnish Jews
Jewish footballers
Veikkausliiga players
Allsvenskan players
Belgian Pro League players
Israeli Premier League players
FinnPa players
FC Jokerit players
AC Allianssi players
FC Hämeenlinna players
FC Honka players
Örebro SK players
Beerschot A.C. players
Hapoel Ironi Kiryat Shmona F.C. players
Klubi 04 players
Association football wingers
Expatriate footballers in Belgium
Expatriate footballers in Sweden
Expatriate footballers in Israel
Finnish expatriate sportspeople in Belgium
Finnish expatriate sportspeople in Sweden
Finnish expatriate sportspeople in Israel